Mound Westonka High School is a grades 812 public high school in Mound, Minnesota, United States. Mound Westonka competes in the Wright County Conference. Mound Westonka, located west of Lake Minnetonka, serves the westernmost portion of the lake and is located west of Minnetonka and south of Orono. Mound Westonka houses over 900 students in grades 8-12. It began as Mound Consolidated High School, which opened in the fall of 1917 in downtown Mound as part of District 85. In 1958, District 85 became Westonka District 277. In the fall of 1971, Mound High School was relocated several miles to a new building at its present location in Minnetrista and “Westonka” was added to its name. Mound High School adopted the “Mohawk” mascot in the 1930s, in part because Mound was named for the ancient Native American burial mounds located within its borders. In the fall of 1997, the school mascot was changed to the White Hawks.

History
Mound Westonka High School was founded as Mound High School.

Voters in the district approved $22.95 million in bond funding in May 2016, resulting in major additions to the south (Westonka Activity Center) and east (Westonka Performing Arts Center). Designed by Wold Architects and Engineers and built by Kraus-Anderson, they were completed in 2018.

Awards and recognitions

The original structure, designed by Hammel, Green and Abrahamson, won a 1972 AIA Minnesota Merit Award.

Mound Westonka High School is ranked among the top high schools in the United States by several national publications. Mound Westonka ranks fifth in Minnesota and 104th in the country on Newsweek's 2014 list of "America's Top High Schools." MWHS was also named to U.S. News & World Report's 2014 "Best High Schools" list, The Washington Post's 2014 "America's Most Challenging High Schools" list and Niche's 2014 "Best Public High Schools" list. The Westonka School District was named to the College Board's AP District Honor Roll in 2012 for increasing access to Advanced Placement exams as well as scores of 3 or higher (usually the minimum to earn college credit).

Athletics and activities

Activities

  Bowling
  Chinese Club
  DECA
  Fall Musical
  Fine Arts Advisors
  Jazz Band
  Know America
  LINK Crew
  Madd Jazz
  MWHS Math League
  National Honor Society
  Pop Singers
  Quiz Bowl 
  Science Olympiad
  Spanish Club
  Speech Team
  Spring Play
  Student Senate 

Sports

Fall
 Soccer
 Football 
 Cross Country
 Football Cheerleading
 Girls Swim & Dive
 Girls Tennis
 Volleyball
Winter
  Alpine Ski
  Boys Basketball 
  Boys Hockey 
  Boys Swim & Dive
  Dance Team
  Girls Basketball
  Girls Gymnastics 
  Girls Hockey
  Nordic Ski
  Wrestling
Spring Sports
  Baseball
  Boys Golf
  Boys Tennis
  Boys Lacrosse
  Girls Golf
  Girls Lacrosse
  Girls Softball
  Track and Field
  Trap Shooting

Campus

Mound Westonka High School itself contains two levels, with separate academic wings for different teaching subjects. The school has a pool as well as an ice arena. On the exterior, the school property has three soccer fields, many baseball/softball fields, nine tennis courts, a track, and a football stadium. Following a referendum in 2016, the Westonka Performing Arts Center and Westonka Activity Center were built, both of which opened in September 2018.

Notable alumni
 Kevin Sorbo, American actor

References

External links
 Official site of Westonka Public Schools
 Minnesota State High School League: Mound Westonka

Public high schools in Minnesota
Schools in Hennepin County, Minnesota